Lake Maninjau (meaning "overlook" or "observation" in the Minangkabau language) is a caldera lake in West Sumatra, Indonesia.

Formation
The Maninjau caldera was formed by a volcanic eruption estimated to have occurred around 52,000 years ago.

The lake
The natural outlet for excess water is the Antokan river, located on the west side of the lake. It is the only lake in Sumatra which has a natural outlet to the west coast. Since 1983, this water has been used to generate hydroelectric power for West Sumatra, generated around 68 MW at maximum load.

Most of the people who live around Lake Maninjau are ethnically Minangkabau. Villages on the shores of the lake include Maninjau and Bayur.

Maninjau is a notable tourist destination in the region due to its scenic beauty and mild climate. It is also a site for paragliding.

Local fishing and agriculture

Two endemic species collected from the lake for local consumption and for export to markets outside the crater are pensi, a species of small mussel, and palai rinuak, a type of small fish. One method of preparing palai rinuak is to grill a mixture of the fish along with coconut and spices, wrapped in a banana leaf.

The lake is used for aquaculture, using karamba floating net cages. The technique was introduced in 1992 and, by 1997, there were over 2,000 cage units with over 600 households engaged. Each cage may have 3-4 production cycles each year. There is evidence of pollution around some karamba areas.

On the edge of the lake, land use includes rice fields in the swamps and the lower slopes. The villages are bordered uphill by a large belt of forest-like tree gardens, which dissolve into the upper montane forest on the steepest parts of the slopes up to the ridge of the caldera.

The tree gardens include three typical components:
 Fruit trees including durian, jack fruit, cempedak, rambutan, langsat, golden berries and water apples.
 Timber species including Toona sinensis and Pterospermum javanicum.
 Spice trees including cinnamon, coffee, nutmeg and cardamum.

Sukarno's pantun

The first president of Indonesia, Sukarno, visited the area in early June 1948. A pantun he wrote about the lake reads:

See also

 List of lakes of Indonesia

References

External links
 

Lakes of Sumatra
VEI-7 volcanoes
Volcanic crater lakes
Landforms of West Sumatra
Tourist attractions in West Sumatra